85°C Bakery Cafe, also brand-named 85 Cafe, 85°C Daily Cafe, or 85 Degrees C, is a Taiwanese international chain of retailers selling coffee, tea, and cakes, as well as desserts, smoothies, fruit juices, souvenirs, and bakery products. It has 1000 retail shops worldwide. The chain's parent company (Gourmet Master Co. Ltd) is located in the Cayman Islands.

History 
Wu Cheng-hsueh incorporated the company in January 2003 and opened the first shop in Bao-Ping, Taipei County (now New Taipei) in July 2004. The name "85°C" refers to Wu's belief that  is the optimal temperature to serve coffee.

In September 2006, the company opened its first overseas store in Sydney Australia. A year later, the first store in China was opened in Shanghai. The first store in Hong Kong was opened in 2012, the first store in the United States in 2008, in Irvine. The US central kitchen began operations in September 2013. In March 2017, the chain's United States central kitchen in Brea, California became its first solar-powered facility worldwide.

Revenue 
In 2016, 67% of the chain's revenue came from China, while 18% came from Taiwan. In 2013, the average US store generated more than US$700,000 in monthly sales, seven times more than an average store in China.

Specialities 
The chain is known for their sea salt coffee, made by sweetening their iced Americano and adding a sea salt whipped cream on the top. This coffee has been featured on TIME Magazine, CNN, and NPR. The concept of this drink supposedly came from the Taiwanese habit of sprinkling salt on fruit to bring out the sweetness.

Gourmet Master Co. Ltd 

In China, 85°C Bakery Cafe stores are advertised as being from Taiwan, but the chain's main company (Gourmet Master Co. Ltd) is registered in the Cayman Islands. Because this mother company is registered in the Cayman Islands, R.O.C. laws do not apply. After being established in Taiwan in 2004 and undergoing equity restructuring in September 2009, the mother company became listed on the Taiwan Stock Exchange in November 2010 under the statute of a foreign company of first listing (thus designated as an "F share," with the "F" denoting "Foreign").

Because the company is listed as an "F share", Wu Cheng-hsueh and other major shareholders pay 20% marginal tax rate on the dividends they receive instead of the top marginal tax rate of 40% they would have to pay as shareholders in a Taiwanese company.

Furthermore, because Gourmet Master Co. Ltd is registered in and retains profits in the low-tax haven Cayman Islands, in 2010, for example, Taiwan lost  in corporate taxes which tax agencies otherwise would have been able to collect if the pre-tax profit had been fully reported by a company in Taiwan.

When the company became publicly listed on the Taiwan Stock Exchange in November 2010, it had  shares in its IPO.

Controversies

United States

Taiwanese President Tsai Ing-wen
In August 2018, an LA branch of Taiwanese-owned 85°C Bakery Cafe served Tsai Ing-wen and gave her an "enthusiastic welcome". Chinese customers of branches in mainland China called for a boycott, while the chain's statement "distancing itself from pro-independence sentiments" angered Taiwanese people, who accused 85°C of "bowing to Chinese pressure".

Mainland China

Use of ingredients
In 2017, Shanghai's market supervision department found that the so-called "pork floss bread" sold in Shanghai at 85°C was not actually made with pure pork floss, but rather was made of "pork floss powder" and contained both pork and pea powder. The department believed that this behavior violated the Consumer Protection Law of the People's Republic of China and imposed a fine of Renminbi 150,000.

Taiwan

Hygiene malpractice
On 24 July 2015, the newspaper China Times reported that a green tea of a retail store in Taoyuan, Taiwan, analyzed by the Department of Public Health of that city during a sampling event, contained 4.7 times as much bacteria as what would be allowed according to the standard set by that Department. This may have been due to poor sanitation or quality of ingredients or inappropriate handling during the production process.

Underpayment 
In 2008, the "95 Youth Labor Union" investigated 50 stores of 85°C Bakery Cafe, of which 32 were found to be involved in unlawful practices. Among them, 22 stores were in violation of wage regulations and 29 were employing uninsured workers.

Australia

Underpayment 
From 2009 to October 2014, in Sydney, Australia, 85°C Bakery Cafe paid four workers (three Taiwanese nationals on Working Holiday Visas and one PRC Chinese exchange student) only 56% of the lawful minimum wage. The Australian Fair Work Ombudsman ordered 85°C Bakery Cafe to reimburse the workers for a total of  it would have paid them had they been employed working for the minimum wage they would be legally entitled to. In January 2021 this enforceable undertaking was allegedly breached in a new claim by the Fair Work Commission which cites a fake student trainee program was a scheme to underpay foreign workers.

See also

 List of coffeehouse chains
 List of companies of Taiwan

References

External links

Offshore companies of the Cayman Islands
Food and drink companies established in 2004
Retail companies established in 2004
Taiwanese brands
Coffeehouses and cafés
Restaurant chains in Taiwan